Castor californicus is an extinct species of beaver that lived in western North America from the end of the Miocene to the early Pleistocene.  Castor californicus was first discovered in Kettleman Hills in California, United States. The species was similar to but larger than the extant North American beaver, C. canadensis.

References

Further reading
 

Prehistoric beavers
Prehistoric mammals of North America
Miocene rodents
Pleistocene rodents
†
Taxa named by Vernon Lyman Kellogg
Fossil taxa described in 1911